Top sirloin is a cut of beef from the primal loin or subprimal sirloin.  Top sirloin steaks differ from sirloin steaks in that the bone and the tenderloin and bottom round muscles have been removed; the remaining major muscles are the gluteus medius and biceps femoris (top sirloin cap steak).

Description
The USDA NAMP/IMPS codes related to this subprimal cut are 181A and 184. 181A is obtained from 181 after removing the bottom sirloin and the butt tender (the part of the tenderloin which is in the sirloin). 184 is obtained from 182 after removing the bottom sirloin. The food service cuts from 184 are 184A through 184F, its portion cut is 1184 and, the "subportion" cuts from 1184 are 1184A through 1184F. 181A is not further divided into food service cuts. In Australia, this cut is called D-rump in the Handbook of Australian Meat and assigned code 2100.

Etymology
The word comes from the Middle English , which itself was derived from the Old French word , meaning sur longe or above the loin. In Modern French, the term evolved to become aloyau or faux-filet.

An often quoted false etymology suggests that sirloin comes from the knighting by an English king (various kings are cited) of a piece of meat. However, the English cut of sirloin includes the large portion of beef which includes the short loin, top sirloin and bottom sirloin.

Cooking styles
Top sirloin steak is usually served grilled, broiled, sautéed, or pan-fried.

See also

 Baseball steak
 Picanha
 List of steak dishes

References

External links
 Chart of beef cuts
 Top sirloin description from Certified Angus Beef
 Bovine myology & muscle profile

Cuts of beef